Evy Leibfarth (born January 26, 2004) is an American slalom canoeist who has competed at the international level since 2019.

Career
In 2019, Leibfarth won the gold medal in the women's K1 event and the silver medal in the women's extreme K1 event at the Pan American Games held in Lima, Peru.

In the same year, Leibfarth also competed at the 2019 World Junior and U23 Canoe Slalom Championships held in Kraków, Poland, winning the gold medal in the junior extreme K1 event and the bronze medal in the junior K1 event.

Leibfarth represented the United States at the 2020 Summer Olympics in Tokyo, Japan. She was among the many LGBT athletes competing at the games. Leibfarth started in both women's events and finished 12th in the K1 event and 18th in the C1 event, after being eliminated in the semifinals on both occasions.

Leibfarth won a bronze medal in extreme slalom at the 2021 World Championships in Bratislava.

Results

World Cup individual podiums

Complete World Cup results

Notes
No overall rankings were determined by the ICF, with only two races possible due to the COVID-19 pandemic.

References

External links

 

Living people
2004 births
People from Jackson County, North Carolina
American female canoeists
Pan American Games medalists in canoeing
Pan American Games gold medalists for the United States
Pan American Games silver medalists for the United States
Canoeists at the 2019 Pan American Games
Medalists at the 2019 Pan American Games
Canoeists at the 2020 Summer Olympics
Olympic canoeists of the United States
American LGBT sportspeople
Medalists at the ICF Canoe Slalom World Championships
21st-century American women